L. nitida may refer to:
 Lithodora nitida, a plant species endemic to Spain
 Lonicera nitida, a shrub species found in China
 Livistona nitida, a palm tree species in genus Livistona

See also 
 Nitida (disambiguation)